Elsa Patricia Araujo de la Torre (born 30 January 1960) is a Mexican politician affiliated with the PRI. As of 2013 she served as Deputy of the LXII Legislature of the Mexican Congress representing Tamaulipas.

References

1960 births
Living people
Politicians from Tamaulipas
Women members of the Chamber of Deputies (Mexico)
Institutional Revolutionary Party politicians
21st-century Mexican politicians
21st-century Mexican women politicians
Autonomous University of Tamaulipas alumni
Deputies of the LXII Legislature of Mexico
Members of the Chamber of Deputies (Mexico) for Tamaulipas